Uchigatani Dam is a gravity dam located in Gifu Prefecture in Japan. The dam is used for flood control. The catchment area of the dam is 39.9 km2. The dam impounds about 46  ha of land when full and can store 11500 thousand cubic meters of water. The construction of the dam was started on 1979 and completed in 2023.

References

Dams in Gifu Prefecture